Joseph (Giuse) Nguyễn Chí Linh (born 22 November 1949) is a Vietnamese prelate of the Catholic Church who has been a bishop since 2004 and the Archbishop of Huế since 2016.

Biography
He was born Nguyễn Chí Linh in Ba Lang, Nghi Sơn, Thanh Hóa Province, Bắc Trung Bộ, Vietnam, on 22 November 1949, the son of Thiher Giaia and Thanh Hóa, Christians from a modest background. While very young, he fled with his family, their fellow villagers, and most of the Christians of the region fled the area and reestablished Christian communities in the southern part of the country. He studied at the minor seminary Stella Maris of Nha Trang from 1962 to 1967, at the Provvidenza College in Hué from 1967 to 1968, at the Good Shepherd College in Nha Trang (1968-1970), and at the Pontifical College in Dalat from 1970 to 1977. From 1977 to 1992, while seminaries were closed in Vietnam, he returned to his family and at a variety of jobs while also serving an internship in the parish of Song My, Phan Rang, Ninh Thuan.

On 20 December 1992 he was ordained a priest of the Diocese of Nha Trang. He then worked in the parish of Phuoc Thien from 1992 to 1995. From 1995 to 2003, he studied at the Institut Catholique de Paris, earning a doctorate in philosophy with a thesis on Maurice Blondel. In November 2003 he returned to his home diocese in Vietnam and taught as a professor at the Seminary of Nha Trang.

On 12 June 2004, Pope John Paul II appointed him Bishop of Thanh Hóa. He received his episcopal consecration on 4 August of that year from Paul Nguyễn Văn Hoà, Bishop of Nha Trang. Within the Catholic Bishops' Conference of Vietnam, he headed the commission on the laity from 2004 to 2007 and the commission for the pastoral care of migrants from 2013 to 2015. He was twice elected to a three-year term as vice-president of the Conference, serving from 2007 to 2013. The conference also elected him one of its two delegates to the 2008 Synod of Bishops on the Word of God in the Life and Mission of the Church. He was also Apostolic Administrator of Phát Diêm from 2007 to 2009.

On 29 October 2016, Pope Francis named him Archbishop of Huế and Apostolic Administrator of the Diocese of Thanh Hoa. He took possession of the Archdiocese on 12 January 2017. His responsibilities in Thanh Hóa ended with the installation of a bishop there in June 2018.

Linh was elected President of the Catholic Bishops' Conference of Vietnam on 5 October 2016, shortly before his transfer to Hue. In that role he has led the nation's bishops in warning against the use of "quasi-magical" practices in liturgies, notably healing services associated with charismatic devotions.

See also
Catholic Church in Vietnam

Notes

References

External links

   

1949 births
Living people
21st-century Roman Catholic archbishops in Vietnam
People from Thanh Hóa province
Institut Catholique de Paris alumni
Vietnamese Roman Catholic archbishops